The 1965 Men's World Weightlifting Championships were held in Tehran, Iran from October 27 to November 3, 1965. There were 85 men in action from 24 nations.

Medal summary

Medal table

References
Results (Sport 123)
Weightlifting World Championships Seniors Statistics

External links
International Weightlifting Federation

World Weightlifting Championships
World Weightlifting Championships
International weightlifting competitions hosted by Iran
World Weightlifting Championships